Anubes Ferraz da Silva (26 September 1935 – 10 December 2014) was a Brazilian sprinter. He competed in the men's 400 metres at the 1960 Summer Olympics. He competed at the 1959 and 1963 Pan American Games in the 400 metres hurdles, placing fourth in 1959 and fifth in 1963.

References

1935 births
2014 deaths
Athletes (track and field) at the 1960 Summer Olympics
Brazilian male sprinters
Brazilian male hurdlers
Olympic athletes of Brazil
Athletes (track and field) at the 1959 Pan American Games
Athletes (track and field) at the 1963 Pan American Games
Pan American Games athletes for Brazil
Athletes from São Paulo
20th-century Brazilian people